The discography of Buck Owens, an American country music artist, consists of 39 studio albums, 16 compilation albums, 9 live albums, 97 singles, and 12 B-sides. After recording under the name Corky Jones and releasing a string of singles in the mid-1950s, Owens signed a recording contract with Capitol Records in February 1957.

After releasing a series of singles over four years, Owens issued his first studio album in 1961, titled Buck Owens Sings Harlan Howard, which included the #2 country hit "Foolin' Around". In 1962, Owens's second effort, You're for Me, also gained success after spawning three major hits and was followed by 1963's On the Bandstand. The songs "Act Naturally" and "Love's Gonna Live Here", released from his album The Best of Buck Owens (1963), were the first of 21 number one singles on the Billboard Hot Country Songs chart. The songs set the trend for a series of Top 10 hits on the Billboard country chart and 13 number-one singles, including "I've Got a Tiger by the Tail", "Buckaroo", and "Open Up Your Heart".

During the 1960s and 1970s, Owens also issued a string of live albums, beginning with Carnegie Hall Concert (1966), which reached #1 on the Billboard Top Country Albums chart. That was followed by 1967's In Japan!, Buck Owens in London "Live" (1969), and Buck Owens Live in Scandinavia (1970). He had major hits in 1970 and 1971 with "The Kansas City Song", "I Wouldn't Live in New York City (If They Gave Me the Whole Damn Town)", "Bridge Over Troubled Water", "Ruby (Are You Mad)", and "Rollin' in My Sweet Baby's Arms". During this time, Owens also collaborated with up-and-coming country artist Susan Raye on the albums We're Gonna Get Together (1970) and The Great White Horse (1970). Owens continued to record under Capitol until his contract expired in 1975 with the release of 41st Street Lonely Heart's Club.

In 1975, Owens signed with Warner Bros. Records and began recording in Nashville, Tennessee. He gained less creative control of his material, and his singles peaked in gradually lower chart positions. He issued two albums under the label: Buck 'Em (1976) and Our Old Mansion (1977). In 1979, his duet with Emmylou Harris, "Play Together Again, Again", reached number 11 on the Billboard Hot Country Songs chart. After leaving the label at the beginning of the 1980s, Owens semi-retired from the music business but returned with Dwight Yoakam in 1988 for the duet "Streets of Bakersfield". The song became his first number-one single since 1972's "Made in Japan", providing Owens a comeback. With the success of the single, Owens returned to recording under Capitol with Hot Dog (1988), Act Naturally (1989), and Kickin' In (1991).

In 2018, Omnivore Recordings released Country Singer's Prayer, an album that Owens recorded for Capitol in November 1975 but was shelved in the wake of its singles ("The Battle of New Orleans" and "Country Singer's Prayer") having had little success on the charts.

Studio albums

Holiday albums

Collaborations

Live albums

Compilation albums

Singles

1950s

1960s

A^ "I Don't Care" also made the AC charts, #18.
B^ "Before You Go" also made the AC charts, #20.

1970s

1980s and 1990s

Other singles

Collaborations

Guest singles

Christmas singles

International singles

Charted B-sides

Music videos

Notes 

A ^ In the Palm of Your Hand also peaked at number 70 on the RPM Top Albums chart in Canada.

References

External links
 

Country music discographies
Discographies of American artists
Bakersfield sound